Anatoly Shchuplyakov (born 2 August 1938) is a Belarusian athlete. He competed in the men's hammer throw at the 1968 Summer Olympics, representing the Soviet Union.

References

1938 births
Living people
Athletes (track and field) at the 1968 Summer Olympics
Belarusian male hammer throwers
Olympic athletes of the Soviet Union
Sportspeople from Nizhny Novgorod
Soviet male hammer throwers